Dipak Barman is an Indian politician from BJP. In May 2021, he was elected as the member of the West Bengal Legislative Assembly from Falakata.

Career
Barman  is from Falakata, Alipurduar district. His father's name is Suresh Chandra Barman. He passed M.A in English From North Bengal University in 2005 and B.Ed from North Bengal University in 2005. He contested in 2021 West Bengal Legislative Assembly election from Falakata Vidhan Sabha and won the seat on 2 May 2021.

References

21st-century Indian politicians
Year of birth missing (living people)
Living people
Bharatiya Janata Party politicians from West Bengal
People from Alipurduar district
West Bengal MLAs 2021–2026